World Tour Golf is a 1986 video game by Evan and Nicky Robinson, Paul Reiche III and published by Electronic Arts for Commodore 64, Amiga, Apple IIGS, and DOS.

Development

After completing Mail Order Monsters in 1985, developers and producers at EA were playing Nintendo Golf, and the Robinsons decided to create a golf game for DOS including a golf course editor.

Evan Robinson worked on the game and graphics code (which was adapted from code written by Dan Silva for an internal EA editor named Prism, which eventually became Deluxe Paint) for World Tour Golf, while Nicky Robinson created the editor and Paul Reiche acted as game designer and artist.  In 1986 it was unusual for a game to have more than one programmer, and this gave them an easy way to neatly subdivide the work.  It also allowed World Tour Golf to be a significantly larger game in scope than many contemporary titles.  The editor supported the accurate (for its day) re-creation of real golf courses, as well as comical courses that were made up of a series of islands, 270-degree doglegs, etc.  This followed in the spirit of Racing Destruction Set, which had been developed at EA the year before.

Reception
COMPUTE! called World Tour Golf "a great game for the novice and the expert". The game was reviewed in 1988 in Dragon #132 by Hartley, Patricia, and Kirk Lesser in "The Role of Computers" column. The reviewers gave the game 4½ out of 5 stars.

David M. Wilson and Johnny L. Wilson reviewed the game for Computer Gaming World, and stated that "IBM owners with CGA used to have to play with magenta trees and blue fairways, but a revision has corrected that aesthetic problem and supports EGA, as well. The EGA version still offers only the four best colors, however."

Reviews
Happy Computer (1987)
64'er (Mar, 1988)
Commodore User (Feb, 1988)
ST/Amiga Format (Sep, 1988)
Tilt (Oct, 1988)
The Games Machine (Sep, 1988)
ACE (Advanced Computer Entertainment) (Sep, 1988)
Info (Nov, 1988)
ASM (Aktueller Software Markt) (Mar, 1987)
Zzap! (Mar, 1988)
Zzap! (Oct, 1988)

References

External links 
 

1986 video games
DOS games
Amiga games
Commodore 64 games
Apple IIGS games
Electronic Arts games
Golf video games
Video games developed in the United States